Anthostema is a flowering plant genus in the Family Euphorbiaceae (spurge family) first described as a genus in 1824. It is native to Africa and Madagascar.

Species
 Anthostema aubryanum Baill. - W + C Africa from Ivory Coast to Cabinda
 Anthostema madagascariense Baill. - Madagascar
 Anthostema senegalense A.Juss. - W Africa from Senegal to Benin

References 

Euphorbiaceae genera
Euphorbieae
Flora of Africa